Kohler Foundation, Inc. is a philanthropic organization that works in the areas of art preservation, grants, scholarships, and performing arts.

History
Kohler Foundation was founded in 1940 by Evangeline Kohler, Marie Christine Kohler, Lillie B. Kohler, Herbert V. Kohler, Sr. and O.A. Kroos.  The original stated purpose of the foundation was for programs involving the aged, orphans, infirm, students, victims of floods, famine, epidemics, tornado and other national emergencies.

When Marie Kohler died in 1943, her will specified that the major portion of her estate went to the Kohler Foundation.

Building projects
Marie Christine Kohler was instrumental in construction of the Waelderhaus in the Village of Kohler.  It was designed by Austrian architect Kaspar Albrecht and was designed a tribute to the tradition of Bregenzerwald (forest of Bregenz) Province of Vorarlberg, Austria. The name Waelderhaus means forest house.  The building was dedicated to the use of the girl scouts and the Kohler Woman's Club upon completion in 1931.  The building is currently managed by the Kohler Foundation and is open for tours and is available for events.

In 1950, the foundation purchased the Wade House in Greenbush, Wisconsin for the purposes of restoration and preservation.  After the restoration was completed, the house was turned over to State Historical Society of Wisconsin.

The foundation was a major sponsor of the construction of the Kohler Memorial addition to the Kohler public school which opened in 1957. The foundation contributed $300,000.  The other major contributors to the project were a trust from the late Governor Kohler worth $500,000, The Village of Kohler, and the Joint School District No. 2. The building cost $1,500,000 to construct and consisted of a grand theater, gymnasium, indoor-outdoor swimming pool, and a youth center. After it was opened, the events for the Distinguished Guest Series were moved to the theater in the building.

Also in 1957, The hospital in Plymouth, Wisconsin completed an addition to which the Foundation  contributed $60,000 towards construction of the east wing which was named The Kohler Wing.

In 1966, the Kohler Foundation gifted the Kohler homestead on New York Avenue in Sheboygan, to the Sheboygan Arts Foundation, Inc. for the establishment of a community arts center.  The arts center was named the John Michael Kohler Arts Center.

In 1980, the foundation purchased the Painted Forest building in Valton, Wisconsin.  The building had been constructed by Modern Woodmen of America in the late 1800s.  In 1898 to 1899 the entire interior had been painted in folk art by itinerant artist Ernest Hűpeden.  The foundation restored the building and entrusted it to Sauk County, Wisconsin with the Historical Society of the Upper Baraboo Valley acting as custodians.  Sauk County returned the site to the foundation in 2001. Additional infrastructure work was completed at the site and in 2004, the Kohler Foundation gifted the Painted Forest to Edgewood College. The foundation also constructed an art studio and study center in Valton and dedicated it to Edgewood in 2005.

Arts

In 1944 the Kohler Woman's Club established the Distinguished Guest Series, sponsoring concerts, plays and speakers, such as the Salzburg Marionettes, the Robert Shaw Chorale, and the singer William Warfield. In May, 1953, it was announced that the Kohler Foundation would join the Kohler Women's Club as a co-sponsor of the series.  This change followed the death of Ruth DeYoung-Kohler in March, 1953.  The series continues to run and the 2013–2014 season is its 70th year.

In 1970 the Kohler Foundation, along with the Kohler Company and the estate of Herbert V. Kohler, Sr., contributed funds for the founding of the Kohler Art Library in the newly constructed Elvehjem Art Center at the University of Wisconsin. The total construction cost of the art center was $3.5 million.  The art library is still housed in the art center along with Chazen Museum of Art.

In 1998, the foundation acquired the home of Loy Allen Bowlin who was known as The Original Rhinestone Cowboy and dismantled and donated it to the John Michael Kohler Art Center where it was reconstructed and is preserved as a folk art treasure.

Scholarships
The Kohler family has a history of funding college scholarship dating to 1927 when the Kohler Family Scholarships were established.  An amount of $10,000 in each of two endowment funds, one for boys and one for girls. The initial amount of the scholarship was a total of no more than $500 to each recipient.  This fund was administered by the University of Wisconsin Board of Regents. The endowment was increased in 1943 by an additional $10,000 by the estate of Marie Kolher.  The funds in the scholarship endowments are periodically increased by the Kohler Foundation.

In 1955, the Kohler Foundation began financing a resident graduate fellowship program called the Marie Christine Kohler Fellowship at the University of Wisconsin.  The students in the program were housed in the former governor's mansion known as the Knapp House.  The program was housed there until 2012.  The foundation continues to support the graduate fellowships at university's Wisconsin Institute for Discovery (WID).  The fund is currently known as the Marie Christine Kohler Fellows @ WID. Fellows receive an annual stipend of $3,000.

Other funding 
The Foundation and the Kohler family has also supported the efforts of the International Crane Foundation by funding education and research and aiding with transportation.  In 1978, the Patrick and Anna M. Cudahy Fund and Kohler Foundation, Inc. supported a full-time educator.  Funding was also given for crane habitat studies in China. In the late 1990s members of the family began transporting Siberian crane eggs between Asia and Baraboo with company jets and continued to do so for a number of years.

References

External links
Kohler Foundation
 

Kohler Company
1940 establishments in Wisconsin
Arts foundations based in the United States
Non-profit organizations based in Wisconsin